Steven Alan Hawley (born December 12, 1951) is a former NASA astronaut who flew on five U.S. Space Shuttle flights. He is professor of physics and astronomy and director of engineering physics at the University of Kansas.

Early life 
Hawley was born December 12, 1951, in Ottawa, Kansas, to Dr. and Mrs. Bernard Hawley. One of Hawley's brothers, John F. Hawley, was a theoretical astrophysicist at the University of Virginia and shared the Shaw Prize in Astronomy in 2013.

Hawley graduated from Salina High School Central, Salina, Kansas, in 1969; he regards Salina as his home town. Hawley attended the University of Kansas, graduating with highest distinction in 1973 with Bachelor of Science degrees in Physics and in Astronomy. He spent three summers employed as a research assistant: 1972 at the U.S. Naval Observatory in Washington, D.C., and 1973 and 1974 at the National Radio Astronomy Observatory in Green Bank, West Virginia. He attended graduate school at Lick Observatory, University of California, Santa Cruz, graduating in 1977 with a Doctorate in Astronomy and Astrophysics.

Career 
Hawley's research involved spectrophotometry of gaseous nebulae and emission-line galaxies, with particular emphasis on chemical abundance determinations for these objects. The results of his research have been published in major astronomical journals. Prior to his selection by NASA in 1978, Hawley was a post-doctoral research associate at Cerro Tololo Inter-American Observatory in La Serena, Chile. He is a Professor (Emeritus) of Physics and Astronomy at the University of Kansas.

Space flight experience 
Hawley logged a total of 770 hours and 27 minutes in five space flights. He served as a mission specialist on STS-41D in 1984, STS-61C in 1986, STS-31 in 1990, STS-82 in 1997 and STS-93 in 1999. Hawley was the last member of NASA Astronaut Group 8 to make a space flight.

Discovery 41D 
STS-41-D Discovery (August 30 to September 5, 1984) was launched from the Kennedy Space Center, Florida, on its maiden flight and landed at Edwards Air Force Base, California. During the seven-day mission, the crew successfully activated the OAST-1 solar cell wing experiment, deployed the SBS-D, SYNCOM IV-2, and TELSTAR 3-C satellites, operated the CFES-III experiment, the student crystal growth experiment, as well as photography experiments using the IMAX motion picture camera. The mission was completed in 96 orbits of the Earth in 144 hours and 57 minutes.

Following an aborted attempt to launch STS-41-D where two main engines were stopped shortly after they started because the third failed to start, Hawley is reported to have broken the tense atmosphere in the shuttle cabin, saying, "Gee, I thought we'd be a lot higher at MECO!"

Columbia 61C 
STS-61-C Columbia (January 12–18, 1986) was launched from the Kennedy Space Center, Florida, and returned to a night landing at Edwards Air Force Base, California. During the six-day flight, the crew deployed the SATCOM K1 satellite and conducted experiments in astrophysics and materials processing. Mission duration was 146 hours and 03 minutes.

Discovery 31 
STS-31 Discovery ( April 24–29, 1990) was launched from the Kennedy Space Center in Florida, and also returned to land at Edwards Air Force Base, California. During the five-day mission, the crew deployed the Hubble Space Telescope, and conducted a variety of middeck experiments involving the study of protein crystal growth, polymer membrane processing, and the effects of weightlessness and magnetic fields on an ion arc. They also operated a variety of cameras, including both the IMAX in-cabin and cargo bay cameras, for Earth observations from their record-setting altitude of 380 miles. The mission was completed in 76 orbits of the earth in 121 hours.

Discovery 82 
STS-82 Discovery (February 11–21, 1997), the second Hubble Space Telescope (HST) maintenance mission, was launched at night and returned to a night landing at Kennedy Space Center, Florida. During the flight, Hawley's primary role was to operate the Shuttle's 50-foot robot arm to retrieve and redeploy the HST following completion of upgrades and repairs. Hawley also operated the robot arm during five spacewalks in which two teams installed two new spectrometers and eight replacement instruments. They also replaced insulation patches over three compartments containing key data-processing, electronics and scientific-instrument telemetry packages. HST was then redeployed and boosted to a higher orbit. The flight was completed in 149 orbits covering 3.8 million miles in 9 days, 23 hours, 37 minutes.

Columbia 93 
STS-93 Columbia (July 22–27, 1999) was launched at night from the Kennedy Space Center on a five-day mission returning to KSC for the 12th night landing in the Shuttle Program's history. Hawley served as Columbias flight engineer. The primary mission objective was the successful deployment of the Chandra X-ray Observatory, the third of NASA's Great Observatories after Hubble Space Telescope and the Compton Gamma Ray Observatory. Hawley also served as the primary operator of a second telescope carried in the crew module and used for several days to make broadband ultraviolet observations of a variety of Solar System objects. The mission completed 79 orbits in 4 days, 22 hours, and 50 minutes.

Organizations 
Hawley is a member of the American Astronomical Society, the Astronomical Society of the Pacific, the American Institute of Aeronautics and Astronautics, Sigma Pi Sigma, and Phi Beta Kappa. Now retired, he resides in Lawrence, Kansas, where his parents also live.

Personal life 
Hawley married fellow astronaut Sally Ride in 1982. The couple divorced in 1987. Subsequently, he married Eileen M. Keegan of Redondo Beach, California, a former public-affairs officer at NASA who was appointed as spokeswoman for then-Kansas Governor Sam Brownback in 2013.

He enjoys basketball, softball, golf, running, playing bridge, and umpiring. Hawley appeared on an episode of Home Improvement, alongside Space Shuttle Commander, Kenneth Bowersox.

Honors 

Following is a list of scholarships, honors, and awards conferred on Hawley:
 Evans Foundation Scholarship, 1970
 University of Kansas Honor Scholarship, 1970
 Summerfield Scholarship, 1970–1973
 Veta B. Lear Award, 1970
 Stranathan Award, 1972
 Outstanding Physics Major Award, 1973
 University of California Regents Fellowship, 1974
 Group Achievement Award for software testing at the Shuttle Avionics Integration Laboratory, 1981
 NASA Outstanding Performance Award, 1981
 NASA Superior Performance Award, 1981
 Group Achievement Award for Second Orbiter Test and Checkout at Kennedy Space Center, 1982
 Quality Increase, 1982
 NASA Space Flight Medal (1984, 1986, 1990, 1997, 1999)
 Group Achievement Award for JSC Strategic Planning, 1987
 NASA Exceptional Service Medal (1988, 1991)
 Special Achievement Award, 1988
 Exceptional Service Medal for Return to Flight, 1988
 Outstanding Leadership Medal, 1990
 Special Achievement Award, 1990
 Haley Flight Achievement Award, 1991
 Kansan of the Year Award, 1992
 Group Achievement Award for ESIG 3000 Integration Project, 1994
 Presidential Rank Award (1994, 1999)
 Group Achievement Award for Space Shuttle Program Functional Workforce Review, 1995
 Group Achievement Award for SFOC Contract Acquisition, 1997
 Kansas Aviation Hall of Fame, 1997
 University of Kansas Distinguished Service Citation, 1998
 NASA Distinguished Service Medal (1998, 2000)
 Aviation Week & Space Technology Laurel Citation for Space, 1998
 V.M. Komarov Diploma from the FAI (Federation Aeronautique Internationale) (1998, 2000)
 Inductee, Astronaut Hall of Fame (2007)
 Distinguished Alumni Award, College of Liberal Arts and Sciences, University of Kansas, (2007)
 Distinguished Alumni Award, UC Santa Cruz, 1991
 Communication and Leadership Award (2015), Toastmasters District 22

References 

1951 births
Living people
NASA civilian astronauts
People from Ottawa, Kansas
People from Salina, Kansas
United States Astronaut Hall of Fame inductees
University of Kansas alumni
University of California, Santa Cruz alumni
Space Shuttle program astronauts
Sally Ride